Home of the Brave is the third studio album and first soundtrack album by avant-garde artist Laurie Anderson, released in 1986 by Warner Bros. Records. The album is a soundtrack of her concert film of the same name.

Three of the eight tracks on the album were recorded in the studio and thus differ considerably from the filmed versions. A music video for "Language Is a Virus" was produced, using the soundtrack studio recording but footage of the live performance.

Two songs on the album were remakes of earlier works: "Language Is a Virus" was originally titled "Language is a virus from outer space - William S. Burroughs" and was performed on Anderson's earlier United States Live (the soundtrack album omits the song's spoken word introduction, "Difficult Listening Hour", which had appeared on United States Live and which was also performed in the film). "Sharkey's Night" is a song from Anderson's previous album, Mister Heartbreak. However this rendition is performed by Anderson herself (the original was vocalized by William S. Burroughs) as it is in the film. Burroughs' voice is heard on the track "Late Show," however. The soundtrack album omits the other live performances of songs from Mister Heartbreak that were featured in the movie.

An alternate, faster-paced version of "Smoke Rings" was recorded for release as a possible single, but there is no indication it was ever issued; it can be heard during Anderson's made-for-TV short film What You Mean We?

Track listing
All compositions written by Laurie Anderson.

 "Smoke Rings" – 6:58 co-produced by Nile Rodgers
 "White Lily" – 1:16
 "Late Show" – 4:30
 "Talk Normal" – 5:27
 "Language Is a Virus" – 4:10 Produced by Nile Rodgers
 "Radar" – 2:03
 "Sharkey's Night" – 6:16
 "Credit Racket" – 3:31

Personnel
Laurie Anderson – vocals, keyboards, violin, Synclavier, vocoder
Joy Askew – keyboards on 1, 7 and 8, Moog synthesizer on 4, Prophet on 4, DX-7 on 4
Adrian Belew – guitar on 3, 4, 7 and 8
David Van Tieghem – drums on 7, percussion on 4 and 8

Additional personnel
Dolette McDonald – vocals on 1, 4, 7
Janice Pendarvis – vocals on 1 and 7
Robert Sabino – keyboards on 1, Morse code on 1
Nile Rodgers – synthesizer, guitar on 1 and 5, keyboards on 5, Synclavier on 5
Jimmy Bralower – drums on 1 and 5
William S. Burroughs – vocal sampling on 3
Richard Landry – saxophone on 3, 4 and 7, clarinet on 4
Robert Aaron – saxophone on 5
Kevin Jones – Synclavier programming on 5
Curtis King – backing vocals on 5
Frank Simms – backing vocals on 5
Diane Garisto – backing vocals on 5
Tawatha Agee – backing vocals on 5
Christopher Sawyer-Laucanno – backing vocals on 5
Brenda White King – backing vocals on 5
Daniel Ponce – percussion on 7
Isidro Bobadilla – percussion on 7
Bill Laswell – bass animals on 8

Technical
Leanne Ungar – engineer
Carolyn Cannon – art direction, design
Les Fincher – cover photography

Charts

References

Concert film soundtracks
Laurie Anderson albums
Albums produced by Nile Rodgers
1986 soundtrack albums
Warner Records soundtracks
Electronic soundtracks